Garrha is a genus of moths of the family Oecophoridae.

Species
Garrha absumptella  (Walker, 1864)
Garrha achroa  (Turner, 1896)
Garrha acosmeta  (Turner, 1896)
Garrha agglomerata  (Meyrick, 1920)
Garrha alma  (Meyrick, 1914)
Garrha amata  (Meyrick, 1914)
Garrha arrhodea  (Turner, 1917)
Garrha atoecha  (Meyrick, 1886)
Garrha atripunctatella  (Turner, 1896)
Garrha brachytricha  (Turner, 1927)
Garrha carnea  (Zeller, 1855)
Garrha cholodella  (Meyrick, 1883)
Garrha coccinea  (Turner, 1917)
Garrha costimacula  (Meyrick, 1883)
Garrha cylicotypa  (Turner, 1946)
Garrha defessa  (Meyrick, 1920)
Garrha demotica  (Meyrick, 1883)
Garrha eugramma  (Lower, 1894)
Garrha gypsopyga  (Meyrick, 1914)
Garrha icasta  (Turner, 1941)
Garrha idiosema  (Turner, 1917)
Garrha interjecta  (Turner, 1946)
Garrha leucerythra  (Meyrick, 1883)
Garrha limbata  (Meyrick, 1883)
Garrha mellichroa  (Lower, 1897)
Garrha mesodesma  (Meyrick, 1889)
Garrha mesogaea  (Turner, 1916)
Garrha metriopis  (Meyrick, 1888)
Garrha micromita  (Turner, 1946)
Garrha miltopsara  (Turner, 1914)
Garrha mitescens  (Meyrick, 1914)
Garrha moderatella  (Walker, 1864)
Garrha ocellifera  (Meyrick, 1883)
Garrha ochra  (Turner, 1946)
Garrha oncospila  (Turner, 1946)
Garrha paraderces  (Meyrick, 1889)
Garrha phaeoporphyra  (Turner, 1939)
Garrha phoenopis  (Turner, 1916)
Garrha platyporphyra  (Turner, 1946)
Garrha pseudota  (Lower, 1901)
Garrha pudica  (Zeller, 1855)
Garrha pyrrhopasta  (Turner, 1946)
Garrha repandula  (Zeller, 1855)
Garrha rubella  (Turner, 1939)
Garrha rufa  (Meyrick, 1883)
Garrha rufescens  (Turner, 1946)
Garrha rufimaculella  (Turner, 1896)
Garrha sericata  (Meyrick, 1883)
Garrha sincerella  Walker, 1866
Garrha spatiosa  (Meyrick, 1921)
Garrha submissa  (Turner, 1946)
Garrha umbratica  (Turner, 1946)
Garrha zonostola  (Meyrick, 1884)

References

Markku Savela's ftp.funet.fi

 
Oecophorinae